Nitzan Kaikov (born 11 October 1987), also known as K-KOV, is an Israeli songwriter and music producer. He is currently based in Los Angeles.

Early life
Refael Nitzan Kaikov, PKA K-Kov (11 October 1987) was born and raised in Bat Yam, Israel to family Bukharan Jews.

Musical career

Career beginning
K-Kov began his career by making beats in his parents attic. 
In 2005 Participate in T.V show Kokhav Nolad the Israeli American Idol seasons 3.
In 2006, he joined the Israeli army and was assigned to IDF in Education Corps as a singer and music producer in the corps's band. During his service, K-Kov got his first big break as a music producer and songwriter for the 2008 annual Hanukkah show "Festigal" Featuring the biggest stars in the Israeli market such as: Gal Gadot, Shiri Maimon, Shlomi Shabat, Oz Zehavi and many more.

2009–2014
In 2009, K-Kov developed, music produced and co-wrote Avihu Shabat's debut album "Avihu". The album was a major success and achieved many awards such as: Platinum album for cellular downloads, "Best new artist of the year" and Most played song of the year. 
In 2010, K-Kov developed, music produced and co-wrote Chen Aharoni's debut album. One of the singles "Breath" became the most played song on Israeli radio stations during 2010 and number 4 on most viewed songs on YouTube.
In 2011, he produced Avihu's second album.
In 2012, Nitzan produced the theme song for the hit TV series "Galis" for HOT.
In March 2012 Nitzan co-wrote and produced the winning song "Tzoeket Lecha" (Calling You) for The Voice Israel- Season 1 winner Kathleen Reiter.
In 2013, K-Kov produced the official remix "Infinite Love" performed by A.R. Rahman two-time Academy Awards winning, the song gained much success and became the tour title.

2015–present
In 2015 K-Kov co-wrote and produced the theme song along with six other songs for Nickelodeon music series Make It Pop seasons 1 & 2. 
That year, K-Kov started working with Keith Urban on the album Ripcord an album that made K-Kov one of the nominees for "Country album of the year" in the Country Music Association Awards and the Grammy Awards The album was also nominated for "Best country album of the year" in the 2017 Grammy awards and won in the American Music Award for Favorite Country Album.

In 2016 K-Kov started working with The Shadowboxers signed to Justin Timberlake as a co-writer. In June 2017, the band started to record their album with K-Kov & Justin Timberlake as co-producers. The band released their debut single on 22 September 2017 "Hot Damn!" co-written by K-Kov & The Shadowboxers and co-produced by Justin Timberlake & K-Kov.

Most recently, K-Kov co-wrote and produced the 2019 single "You Don't Even Know Me" co-written and performed by Faouzia.

Discography
 "Catch The festigl" (2008)	
 "Avihu" – the debut album by Avihu Shabat (2009)	
 "Chen Aharoni's debut album Chen Aharoni (2010)	
 "Feels Good", the second album by Avihu Shabat (2011)
 "Haamtzan" (Oxygen) by Itzik Shamly (2011)
 "Yom Ehad Tevakshy" by Shir Levy (2011)
 "Ken Lahava" by Idan Yaniv (2011)
 "Nosea Rachok" by Chen Aharoni (2012)
 "Snow in the heat wave" by Shiri Maimon (2012) 
 "Spy Festigal" (2013)
 "Derech" by Avihu Shabat (2013)
 "Kol hamilim Ha'smechot" by Moshe Peretz (2014) 
 "Ha'lev" by Shlomi Shabat (2015)
 "Besof kol yom" by Eyal Golan (2015)
 "Make It Pop, Vol. 1" by Make It Pop cast (2015)
 "Make It Pop, Vol. 2" by Make It Pop cast (2016)
 "Simaney Hazman" by Moshe Peretz (2016)
 Ripcord by Keith Urban (2016)
 "Nisim Shkufim" by Rita (Israeli singer) (2017)
 "Apollo" EP by The Shadowboxers (2018)

Singles

References

External links
CMA Awards Nominees
Keith Urban ‘Totally Blown Away’ by His Three Grammy Nominations
New album by Keith Urban Ripcord out May 6th 2016
Kathleen Reiter is the winner of the "de Vise"
Nitzan Kaikov Songs

1987 births
Israeli composers
Israeli soldiers
Living people
People from Bat Yam
Israeli record producers
Israeli songwriters